The Three Musketeers is a 1916 American silent adventure film directed by Charles Swickard and starring Orrin Johnson, Dorothy Dalton, and Louise Glaum. It is an adaptation of Alexandre Dumas' 1844 novel The Three Musketeers. Prints survive of this film, with one existing in the George Eastman House.

Plot summary

Cast
 Orrin Johnson as D'Artagnan  
 Dorothy Dalton as Queen Anne  
 Louise Glaum as Miladi Winter  
 Harvey Clark as Duke of Buckingham  
 Walt Whitman as Cardinal Richelieu 
 Arthur Maude as Count de Rochefort  
 George Fisher as King Louis XIII 
 Rhea Mitchell as Constance Bonacieux  
 Alfred Hollingsworth as Athos  
 Edward Kenny as Porthos  
 Claude N. Mortensen as Aramis  
 J.P. Lockney as Bonacieux

References

Bibliography
 Klossner, Michael. The Europe of 1500-1815 on Film and Television: A Worldwide Filmography of Over 2550 Works, 1895 Through 2000. McFarland & Company, 2002.

External links
 
 

1916 films
American historical adventure films
American silent feature films
1910s historical adventure films
Films directed by Charles Swickard
Films set in Paris
Films based on The Three Musketeers
American black-and-white films
Cultural depictions of Cardinal Richelieu
Cultural depictions of Louis XIII
1910s English-language films
1910s American films
Silent historical adventure films